The men's 200 metres at the 2005 World Championships in Athletics was held at the Helsinki Olympic Stadium on August 9, 10 and 11 August.

Medals

Results
All times shown are in seconds.
Q denotes qualification by place.
q denotes qualification by time.
DNS denotes did not start.
DNF denotes did not finish.
AR denotes area record
NR denotes national record.
PB denotes personal best.
SB denotes season's best.

Heats
August 9

Heat 1
  Stéphane Buckland, Mauritius 20.94 Q
  Andrew Howe, Italy 21.08 Q
  Aaron Armstrong, Trinidad and Tobago 21.10 Q
  Panagiotis Sarris, Greece 21.43
  André da Silva, Brazil 21.44
  Heber Viera, Uruguay 21.71
  Nabie Foday Fofana, Guinea 22.16 (SB)
  Afzal Baig, Pakistan 22.54

Heat 2
  Ronald Pognon, France 20.37 Q
  Brian Dzingai, Zimbabwe 20.76 Q
  Yordan Ilinov, Bulgaria 20.85 Q
  Hamed Hamadan Al-Bishi, Saudi Arabia 21.03
  Julieon Raeburn, Trinidad and Tobago 21.12
  Evans Marie, Seychelles 21.65
  Noor Adi Bin Rostam, Brunei 24.05
  Obadele Thompson, Barbados DNS

Heat 3
  Christian Malcolm, Great Britain 20.36 Q
  John Capel, United States 20.40 Q (SB)
  Sebastian Ernst, Germany 20.45 Q (SB)
  Patrick Johnson, Australia 20.56 q (SB)
  Tommi Hartonen, Finland 20.59 q (SB)
  Daniel Abenzoar-Foulé, Luxembourg 21.10 (PB)
  Nicholas Mangham, Palau 24.39 (PB)
  Omar Brown, Jamaica DNF

Heat 4
  Tobias Unger, Germany 20.45 Q
  Christopher Williams, Jamaica 20.64 Q
  Marlon Devonish, Great Britain 20.75 Q
  Olusoji Fasuba, Great Britain 20.88 q
  Matic Osovnikar, Slovenia 20.94
  Basílio de Moraes, Brazil 20.99
  Abubaker El Tawerghi, Libya 21.72 (SB)
  Darian Forbes, Turks and Caicos Islands DNS

Heat 5
  Usain Bolt, Jamaica 20.80 Q
  Shingo Suetsugu, Japan 20.85 Q
  Kristof Beyens, Belgium 20.88 Q
  Koura Kaba Fantoni, Italy 21.10
  Kevon Pierre, Trinidad and Tobago 21.24
  Oumar Loum, Senegal 21.37
  Béranger Bosse, Central African Republic 22.02

Heat 6
Wind: 4.3 m/s
  Tyson Gay, United States 19.99 Q
  Marcin Jędrusiński, Poland 20.14 Q
  Jaysuma Saidy Ndure, Gambia 20.14 Q
  Uchenna Emedolu, Nigeria 20.22 q
  Johan Wissman, Sweden 20.26 q
  Leigh Julius, South Africa 20.37 q
  Paul Hession, Ireland 20.40 q

Heat 7
  Daniel Batman, Australia 20.68 Q
  Guus Hoogmoed, Netherlands 20.80 Q
  Justin Gatlin, United States 20.90 Q
  Shinji Takahira, Japan 21.03
  Dmytro Hlushchenko, Ukraine 21.15
  Mphelave Dlamin, Swaziland 21.79 (PB)
  Dion Crabbe, British Virgin Islands 21.82
  Francis Obikwelu, Portugal DNS

Heat 8
  Wallace Spearmon, United States 20.51 Q
  Juan Pedro Toledo, Mexico 20.78 Q
  Joseph Batangdon, Cameroon 20.84 Q
  Dominic Demeritte, Bahamas 20.90 q
  Yaozu Yang, PR China 21.03
  Bruno Pacheco, Brazil 21.05
  David Alerte, France DNF

Quarterfinals
August 10

Heat 1
  Tobias Unger, Germany 20.91 Q
  Wallace Spearmon, United States 20.91 Q
  Patrick Johnson, Australia 20.94 Q
  Joseph Batangdon, Cameroon 21.38
  Paul Hession, Ireland 21.69
  Yordan Ilinov, Bulgaria 21.94
  Brian Dzingai, Zimbabwe 22.32
  Juan Pedro Toledo, Mexico DSQ

Heat 2
  Tyson Gay, United States 20.64 Q
  Stéphane Buckland, Mauritius 20.66 Q
  Jaysuma Saidy Ndure, Gambia 20.95 Q
  Marcin Jędrusiński, Poland 21.07 q
  Johan Wissman, Sweden 21.16
  Andrew Howe, Italy 21.19
  Dominic Demeritte, Bahamas 21.25
  Uchenna Emedolu, Nigeria DNF

Heat 3
  John Capel, United States 20.78 Q
  Usain Bolt, Jamaica 20.87 Q
  Aaron Armstrong, Trinidad and Tobago 20.94 Q
  Christian Malcolm, Great Britain 21.02 q
  Shingo Suetsugu, Japan 21.11 q
  Leigh Julius, South Africa 21.45
  Sebastian Ernst, Germany 21.54
  Olusoji Fasuba, Nigeria 21.92

Heat 4
  Christopher Williams, Jamaica 20.93 Q
  Justin Gatlin, United States 20.94 Q
  Marlon Devonish, Great Britain 20.95 Q
  Daniel Batman, Australia 20.95 q
  Ronald Pognon, France 21.26
  Guus Hoogmoed, Netherlands 21.26
  Kristof Beyens, Belgium 21.43
  Tommi Hartonen, Finland 21.54

Semifinals
August 10

Heat 1
  John Capel, United States 20.45 Q
  Wallace Spearmon, United States 20.49 Q
  Tobias Unger, Germany 20.63 Q
  Usain Bolt, Jamaica 20.68 Q
  Jaysuma Saidy Ndure, Gambia 20.75
  Daniel Batman, Australia 20.98
  Christian Malcolm, Great Britain 21.09
  Aaron Armstrong, Trinidad and Tobago DNS

Heat 2
  Tyson Gay, United States 20.27 Q
  Justin Gatlin, United States 20.47 Q
  Stéphane Buckland, Mauritius 20.54 Q
  Patrick Johnson, Australia 20.65 Q
  Christopher Williams, Jamaica 20.72
  Shingo Suetsugu, Japan 20.84
  Marlon Devonish, Great Britain 20.93
  Marcin Jędrusiński, Poland 20.99

Final
August 11

External links
IAAF results

References

200m
200 metres at the World Athletics Championships